Medusafissurella chemnitzii is a species of sea snail, a marine gastropod mollusk in the family Fissurellidae, the keyhole limpets and slit limpets.

Description
The length of the shell attains 24.6 mm.

Distribution
This marine species occurs off Angola.

References

External links
 Sowerby, G. B., I. (1835). [Characters of shells collected by Mr. Cuming on the western coast of South America, and among the islands of the South Pacific Ocean. Proceedings of the Zoological Society of London. 1834: 123–128.]
 To Encyclopedia of Life
 To World Register of Marine Species

Fissurellidae
Gastropods described in 1835